Camp Thirteen (French: Campement 13) is a 1940 French drama film directed by Jacques Constant and starring Alice Field, Gabriel Gabrio and Paul Azaïs. It is set amongst a group of workers who are housed in a barracks known as Camp Thirteen.

Cast
 Alice Field as Greta  
 Gabriel Gabrio as Charles  
 Paul Azaïs as Jean-Pierre  
 Geneviève Picard
 Jean Clarens 
 Nino Constantini
 Maurice Maillot as Petit Louis  
 Henri Marchand as Un ouvrier du chantier 
 Marcel Maupi as Un marinier  
 Gérard Castrix
 Alexandre Rignault as Pascal  
 Lucien Nat as Carlos  
 Sylvia Bataille as Marie-Louise 
 Eugène Stuber as Un ouvrier du chantier

References

Bibliography 
 Crisp, Colin. Genre, Myth and Convention in the French Cinema, 1929-1939. Indiana University Press, 2002.

External links 
 

1940 films
1940 drama films
French drama films
1940s French-language films
French black-and-white films
1940s French films